Paul Silex (20 March 1858, Gorgast – 20 January 1929, Berlin) was a German ophthalmologist. He is known for contributions made involving war-related blindness.

He studied medicine at the Universities of Halle, Berlin and Breslau, obtaining his doctorate in 1883. Afterwards he served as an assistant to ophthalmologist Ludwig Laqueur (1839-1909) in Strasbourg, followed by several years (1884-1897) as an assistant to Karl Ernst Theodor Schweigger (1830-1905) in Berlin.

He received his habilitation in 1890, becoming an associate professor in 1897. In Berlin he opened a private clinic at St. Maria Victoria-Krankenhaus.

Associated eponym 
 "Silex's sign": A pathognomonic sign of congenital syphilis, indications being radial furrows about the mouth.

Selected writings 
 Compendium der Augenheilkunde, 1899 -  Compendium of ophthalmology; (published over several editions).
 Über das Sehvermögen der Eisenbahnbeamten, 1894  - On the vision of railway officials.
 Neue Wege in der Kriegsblindenfürsorge,  1916 -  New approaches to war-blind welfare.

References 

1929 deaths
1858 births
People from Märkisch-Oderland
People from the Province of Brandenburg
German ophthalmologists
University of Halle alumni
Humboldt University of Berlin alumni
University of Breslau alumni
Academic staff of the Humboldt University of Berlin